It Ain't Me Babe is the debut studio album by the American rock band the Turtles. It was released in October 1965 on White Whale Records.

Background
Prior to recording, the band members required written permission from their parents due to being underage. Included on the album is original work from the band's high school performing days and their own interpretations of popular songs from other musicians. The most successful track "It Ain't Me Babe" reached #8 on the national charts.

Sundazed Records licensed the rights to the Turtles' library and has re-released most of the group's early albums. In 2016, a remastered edition was issued as part of the box set The Complete Original Album Collection featuring both the mono and stereo mixes of the album on a single CD; this edition was also issued separately in 2017.

Track listing

Personnel
Al Nichol - lead guitar, keyboards, vocals, bass guitar
Jim Tucker - rhythm guitar, vocals
Mark Volman - guitar, tambourine, vocals
Don Murray - drums
Howard Kaylan - keyboards, lead vocals
Chuck Portz - bass guitar, vocals

Charts

Billboard 200- 
It Ain't Me Babe- No. 98

Billboard Hot 100- 
 It Ain't Me Babe- No. 8
 The Grim Reaper of Love- No. 81

References

The Turtles albums
1965 debut albums
White Whale Records albums
Albums produced by Bones Howe